David Bianchi is an American-Brazilian actor, producer, and screenwriter.

With over 90 professional film and television credits as an actor, he can be seen in major films and indies like Elizabethtown, Priest, Filly Brown as well as numerous TV appearances on shows like HBO's Westworld, Unsolved, Animal Kingdom, S.W.A.T., The Last Ship, Southland, SEAL Team, and Pretty Little Liars.

Background
Bianchi first appeared on stage in the third grade in Mexico City. He is classically trained with a BFA in theatre and film from Arizona State University. He is fluent in English, Spanish, and Portuguese.

Bianchi is also a painter and has exhibited his works in gallery shows in Scottsdale, Beverly Hills, and Los Angeles. In 2011, he received a congratulatory letter from the City of Los Angeles and then-Mayor Antonio Villaraigosa for his artistic endeavors in North Hollywood.

Career

In 2019, he played in a recurring role on Season 4 of Queen Of The South as Manny. In 2021, he played in a major recurring role of Lilo on Tyler Perry's Ruthless.

As a result of his work in front of the camera, Bianchi is an active voting member of the Academy of Television Arts and Sciences as well as being a member of the National Association of Latino Independent Producers (NALIP) and was nominated for an Imagen Award. He has 18 professional producer credits, 16 screenwriter credits and is the founder of Exertion Films. Bianchi is a member of the Producers Guild of America. He is the producer, writer, and star of All Out Dysfunktion! (Directed by Ryan LeMasters). The film co-stars Rene Rosado, Emmy-winner Vincent De Paul, Gerry Bednob, and Geraldine Viswanathan. Bianchi was the executive producer of the film Her Name Was Jo.

Bianchi is currently in post-production on Catalyst (directed by Christopher Folkens). He stars with action star Patrick Kilpatrick, Michael Roark, and Noel Gugliemi. This is his fifth feature film as a producer. He also appeared in Birds of Prey, a Harley Quinn film, starring Margot Robbie and Ewan McGregor in 2020.

He is a Spoken Word poet with TV appearances on two seasons of the NAACP Award-nominated show Verses and Flow. Bianchi produces spoken word films collaborating with others in the field including Mustafa Shakir, Joivan Wade and Emmy-nominated, Grammy Award-winning actor/poet Malcolm Jamal Warner. Bianchi coined the term spinema or "spinning cinema" through spoken word, which he describes as high concept cinematic experimental films told entirely in spoken word poetry addressing socially-conscious themes.

In 2020, his poetic short film I Can't Breathe was broadcast as part of the Emmy-nominated KTLA series Breaking Bias. The work sold on the NFT platform Ephimera raising over $10,000 for the George Floyd Memorial Foundation, becoming the first spoken word film non-fungible token. His work, Wade in the Water, was named best short film for 2021 by Film Threat Magazine Award This!

Selected filmography

Film

Television

Video Game

References

External links
 David Bianchi Official site
 Exertion Films

Brazilian male film actors
American male film actors
Living people
Place of birth missing (living people)
Year of birth missing (living people)
Brazilian male television actors
American male television actors